David Bruce Cole (August 29, 1930 – October 26, 2011) was an American professional baseball pitcher, who played in Major League Baseball (MLB) for six seasons, between 1950 and 1955.

Born in Williamsport, Maryland and attended Williamsport High School, Cole was known as one of the "wildest" pitchers with a career BB/9 of 7.556

Cole achieved the notable feat of recording three outs without throwing a single strike while pitching for the Boston Braves in 1952 in a game against the Philadelphia Phillies.

Cole spent four years with the Braves, following the team from Boston to Milwaukee before spending a season with the Chicago Cubs. From the Cubs, he was traded to the Philadelphia Phillies for Roy Smalley Jr. Upon his trade to Philadelphia in 1955, he is said to have remarked: "That's too bad; they're the only team I can beat."

References

External links

Dave Cole at SABR (Baseball BioProject)

2011 deaths
1930 births
Baseball players from Maryland
Boston Braves players
Chattanooga Lookouts players
Chicago Cubs players
Des Moines Bruins players
Jackson Senators players
Major League Baseball pitchers
Milwaukee Braves players
Milwaukee Brewers (minor league) players
Montreal Royals players
Pawtucket Slaters players
People from Williamsport, Maryland
Philadelphia Phillies players
Pueblo Dodgers players
St. Paul Saints (AA) players